Austrasiatica langfordi, common name : Langford's cowry, is a species of sea snail, a cowry, a marine gastropod mollusc in the family Cypraeidae, the cowries.

Subspecies
Austrasiatica langfordi cavatoensis (Lorenz, F. Jr., 2002)
Austrasiatica langfordi langfordi (Kuroda, 1938)
Austrasiatica langfordi moretonensis (Schilder, F.A., 1965)
 Austrasiatica langfordi poppeorum Lorenz & Chiapponi, 2017

Description
The shell size varies between 37 mm and 70 mm

Distribution
This species occurs in the Pacific Ocean off Japan and Northern Australia.

References

 Kuroda T. (1938). Two new Japanese cowries. Venus. 8(3–4): 129–133, pls 5–7
 Meyer, C.P. (2004) Toward comprehensiveness: Increased molecular sampling within Cypraeidae and its phylogenetic implications. Malacologia 46(1): 127–156.
 Bouchet, P.; Fontaine, B. (2009). List of new marine species described between 2002–2006. Census of Marine Life.
 Lorenz F. & Chiapponi M. (2017). The Philippine population of Austrasiatica langfordi (Kuroda 1938) (Gastropoda: Cypraeidae). Acta Conchyliorum. 16: 69–75

External links
 

Cypraeidae
Gastropods described in 1938